is a Japanese speed skater. He competed in three events at the 1988 Winter Olympics.

References

1969 births
Living people
Japanese male speed skaters
Olympic speed skaters of Japan
Speed skaters at the 1988 Winter Olympics
Sportspeople from Gunma Prefecture
20th-century Japanese people